Gungu is an administrative ward in Kigoma-Ujiji District of Kigoma Region in Tanzania. 
In 2016 the Tanzania National Bureau of Statistics report there were 27,764 people in the ward, from 25,224 in 2012.

Villages / neighborhoods 
The ward has 7 villages and neighborhoods.

 Buronge
 Bushabani
 Butunga
 Gezaulole
 Kikungu
 Masanga
 Mwenge

References

Wards of Kigoma Region